Abitor Makafui is a physically disabled Togolese female pastor, activist and gospel music singer. In 2009, she was awarded the "Woman Leader" prize for her work in the Makafui foundation, a charitable non-governmental organization helping underprivileged children in Togo.

References 

Year of birth missing (living people)
Living people
Gospel singers
Togolese activists
Togolese clergy
Togolese women singers
20th-century Togolese women
21st-century Togolese women